The International Music Festival of F. L. Vek is a festival of classical music in the Hradec Králové Region of the Czech Republic.

The International Music Festival of F. L. Vek was founded in 2011 in Dobruška. In the name of the festival's name of personality František Vladislav Hek, native from Dobruška, patriot, writer, musician and composer. Alois Jirásek had used autobiography of Hek in the novel F. L. Věk, filmed by Czech Television. Festival has been held under the auspices of many Czech personalities (Jiří Bělohlávek). Organizer is MAS Pohoda venkova and the Town of Dobruška, Artistic Director is Pavel Svoboda.

Venue of concerts
The festival takes place in:
Church of Holy Spirit, Dobruška
Church of Saint Wenceslaus, Dobruška
Husův sbor, Dobruška
Showroom of Servisbal Obaly company, Dobruška
Cultural house in Solnice
Church of Saint Procopius, Přepychy
Church of Saint Mary Magdalene, Deštné v Orlických horách
Evangelical church, Bohuslavice
Opočno Castle

Soloists and orchestras
Radek Baborák - French horn, Jiří Bárta – Cello, Iva Kramperová, Ivan Ženatý, Josef Špaček, Václav Hudeček – Violin, 
Jaroslav Tuma, Pavel Svoboda – Organ, Kateřina Englichová – Harp, Ludmila Peterková - Clarinet, 
Michiyo Keiko (Japan), Raffaella Milanesi (Italy) – Soprano, Pavel Steidl - Guitar, Bennewitz Quartet,
Barocco sempre giovane Orchestra, The Czech Chamber Philharmonic Orchestra Pardubice, Talich Philharmonia Prague, 
Boni Pueri, the Czech Boys Choir, Orchestra of period-instruments Collegium 1704 with conductor Václav Luks.

Premieres
There are world premiers composed for the festival: 
 2011 Luboš Sluka: Meditation for violin and organ
 2012 The choral work Žákovská koleda from the composer Sylvie Bodorová and the show about František Vladislav Hek presented by narrator Alfred Strejček.

F. L. Věk International Music Festival Award
The project of F.L. Věk International Music Festival Award aims to prize a person, whose activities or artistic achievements contributed to the regional culture.

The Award for 2012 was given to professor Václav Rabas, the organist and the founding director of the Conservatory of Pardubice. Václav Rabas accepted the award from the hands of Senator Miluše Horská. This event was also attended by Luboš Sluka - composer, which is the holder of this award 2011.

References

External links
[

Music festivals established in 2011
Classical music festivals in the Czech Republic